A Child's Hope (Simplified Chinese: 孩有明天) is a MediaCorp TV Channel 8 Chinese drama which stars Tay Ping Hui, Phyllis Quek and Huang Biren. It was aired in 2003 on weekday nights at 5:30pm and ran for 2 series. Scenes were filmed at the Singapore General Hospital and National University Hospital. The opening theme 为明天 was used for both seasons.

Story
This medical drama focuses on the working and personal lives of the doctors, social workers and trainee nurses in the paediatric department who care for critically ill children with chronic disease or terminal illness, such as congenital heart diseases and kidney problems.

Using the hospital as a backdrop, the drama brings forth the importance of understanding the true needs of these children and their families. The drama also highlights the strain on the doctors, nurses and social workers who have to strike a balance between wanting the best for their patients and making sure that their actions are 'socially correct'.

The various heroes and angels in this drama include Dr Huang Junsheng (Tay Ping Hui), the responsible and committed paediatrician who dedicates too much time at the hospital and as a result neglects his girlfriend; Sunny (Phyllis Quek), the social worker who believes in giving her best to care for the patients and their families; and three nursing student interns from a polytechnic. They are the bubbly but muddle-headed, Fan Danmei (Florence Tan), the cool and matured Fang Xiuyue (Yvonne Lim) and the mission driven Hong Zhonggeng (Dasmond Koh).

The cast also features Chen Shucheng, Huang Biren, Chen Huihui, Ivy Lee, Huang Yiliang and many others as family members of the main characters and hospital patients.

Cast

Season 1 (2003)

Main cast

Other cast

Season 2 (2004)

Main cast

Other cast

Accolades
The series was nominated for Star Awards in the 2003 and 2004 award ceremonies; the first series lost out the Best Drama Series to Holland V in 2003 (which at the time, was the biggest winner for the ceremony), but the second series won the award.

Season 1 (2003)

Season 2 (2004)

See also
List of programmes broadcast by Mediacorp Channel 8

External links
 Official Website (Via Wayback Machine)
 Official Website (Via Wayback Machine)

Singapore Chinese dramas
2003 Singaporean television series debuts
2004 Singaporean television series endings
Singaporean medical television series
2000s Singaporean television series
Channel 8 (Singapore) original programming